The Commissioner can refer to:

 James Gordon (comics), a character from Batman, known as The Commissioner
 The Commissioner (film), a 1998 film